Fellows of the Royal Society elected in 1958.

Fellows 

Michael Abercrombie
Sir Edward Penley Abraham
John Randal Baker
Arthur John Birch
Satyendra Nath Bose
Percy Wragg Brian
Edith Bulbring
Robert Kenneth Callow
Sir Frank Dixey
Paul Peter Ewald
Frank John Fenner
Sir William Henry Glanville
Albert Edward Green
 Sir Alexander Haddow
Graham Higman
Arthur St George Joseph McCarthy Huggett
Hugh Christopher Longuet-Higgins
Basil Lythgoe
Sisir Kumar Mitra
Clifford Hiley Mortimer
Sir Ronald Sydney Nyholm
George Dixon Rochester
Sir Owen Alfred Saunders
Sir James Eric Smith
William Bertram Turrill

Foreign members 

Andre Michel Lwoff
Nikolai Nikolaevich Semenov
George Gaylord Simpson
Arthur Stoll

References

1958
1958 in science
1958 in the United Kingdom